is a Japanese manga series written and illsutrated by Youko Hanabusa. It was published by Akita Shoten in the  shōjo manga magazine Hitomi Comics from 1987 to 1993 and collected in 12 tankoubon volumes. The manga series was adapted into two anime television series, entitled, Lady Lady!! and its sequel Hello! Lady Lynn, produced by Toei Animation.

The first season of the anime series, entitled  consists of 21 episodes and was aired on Wednesdays from October 21, 1987 to March 23, 1988 on TBS.

Youko later made two sequels, Lady Lynn!! (レディ リン!) and the dōjinshi Lynn no Kodomotachi & Peter Pan (リンのこどもたち&ぴぃたぁぱん)

Summary

Young Lynn and her mother travel from Japan to meet Lynn's father, Viscount Marble, who lives in England. On their way to the Marble Mansion, Lynn and her mother get into a tragic car accident in which Lynn's mother is killed. When Lynn wakes up in the hospital, the truth about her mother's death is kept as a secret from her since her father cannot bear to bring her such grief.

Soon after Lynn moves to her father's care to the Marble Mansion where she encounters a miscellaneous cast of servants, most of who are charmed by Lynn's adorableness. Lynn also finds out that she isn't the only child of Viscount Marble – she meets her elder half sister Sarah, whose mother has also died. At first Sarah seems cold and distant towards her, because she fears that Lynn's open and cheerful personality will win over the attention of their father as well as the two handsome young Brighton brothers who live nearby.

After a string of events, the two sisters finally form a strong bond. Then problems arise with the arrival of the scheming Waveburys who take it upon themselves to run the household in the Marble Mansion while the Viscount Marble is away. The motherless little girl tries to accommodate to the high society life and get the approval of the nobility. Her greatest wish is to become what her mother hoped her to be – a true Lady.

Much later, because of unpaid debts, the Russels lose the Marble Mansion to the bank. Sarah and Lynn are put into different homes. Nonetheless, Lynn never gives up and finally becomes a lady.

Characters

Lynn is a cheerful and innocent 5-year-old Anglo-Japanese girl who wishes to be accepted by her new family. She is naïve yet has an optimistic personality. She is the second daughter of Viscount Marble-George Russell and Misuzu Midorikawa. Though she is half-English and half-Japanese descent, her appearance is predominantly English, especially having a wavy blonde hair. Her name Lynn is sometimes spelled as Rin to keep her Japanese ancestry.
Her mother was killed from a car accident while protecting Lynn and wasn't told the truth until Baroness Magdalene coldly told her about it. She holds her mother's keepsake, the Lady's Key and promised that she'll persevere to become a true Lady. Lynn loves and cares for her father and sister so much that she is willing to make sacrifices even her own happiness just for their sake. She is good at horseback riding, under the tutelage of Arthur and his steed Alessandra who is particularly fond of her. She has a pet kitten named Queen.

Sarah is Lynn's elder half sister. She is the firstborn daughter of Viscount Marble–George Russell and Lady Frances Russell. She is 5 years older than Lynn. Cold and distant at their first meeting, Sarah is actually kind and caring. Gradually, she cherishes Lynn as if she is her own younger sister, spurred on by their same state of being motherless, and defends her from the abuses of the Waveburys.
Unlike Lynn, Sarah doesn't have any memory of her mother since she died before she could even remember. Her mother's only keepsake is the flute and the musical score. She is very good at painting and an excellent flutist. Sarah has feelings for Arthur.

Arthur is the handsome eldest son and heir of the noble Brighton family. He is also Edward's elder brother. Calm, reserved and charming, Arthur is an excellent equestrian, and together with his noble steed Alessandra, wins a competition hosted by the equestrian club in the course of the series. He and Sarah have been friends long before Lynn arrived in England. He also personifies Lynn's idea of a fairy tale prince.

Edward is Arthur's younger brother. Energetic and playful, he is very protective of Lynn and would do anything for her sake. Though he can ride horses like his brother, he cannot ride Alessandra since the latter refuses to be ridden on by anyone except Arthur and Lynn. Later in the series, Edward manages to ride on Alessandra to stop Lynn and convinced her from going back to Japan.

George Russell is the Viscount Marble and he is Lynn and Sarah's handsome father. Gentle and kind, he loves his children dearly and will do anything for their sakes. He is away on business trips a lot in order to pay back the money he owed to the bank for his businesses, with the Marble Mansion as the collateral. George works hard to the point of endangering his health. He is pressured by his father, the Duke Warbawn, to marry the Baroness Wavebury to pay off his debts.

Frances was the first wife of the Viscount Marble and Sarah's mother. She has a kind and gentle personality and cares her loved ones very much. She died when Sarah was very young so Sarah does not have any memory of her. She and George met in college and rode horses together with their friends. She is also an excellent flutist. Her portrait hangs in the Marble Mansion. Throughout the series, she is seen as the ideal Lady, both by Lynn and Sarah.

Misuzu was Lynn's mother. She met George when he was in Japan for a business trip. She also has a similar personality as his late wife and a reason why he chose her. She was killed from a tragic car accident while protecting Lynn from harm. Her wish for Lynn is for her to become a true Lady.

Baroness Magdalene Wavebury is Sarah and Lynn's almost stepmother. Together with her children, Thomas and Mary, they play as the antagonists of the story. She wants to marry the Viscount Marble in order for her family to be incorporated in the nobility. She turns a blind eye to her children's wrongdoings while heaping the blame on Lynn. Her family is very wealthy and is capable of paying off George's debts.

Thomas is the older of the Wavebury siblings. He is a mean and mischievous boy who, together with his sister Mary, enjoys tormenting Lynn. He has a penchant of playing with his pistol and shooting the roses and Mary's cat, Prince. He is also a habitual liar. However, he is quite cowardly and runs away when his pranks are found out.

Mary is the younger of the Wavebury siblings. Like her brother, she enjoys making Lynn miserable. Although unlike Thomas, she experiences pangs of conscience when her pranks go too far. She owns a cat named Prince but she is sometimes mean to him.

Richard Warbawn is the father of the Viscount Marble. Brooding and serious, he refuses to recognize Lynn as a member of the family because of her family background. He is pressuring George to marry the Baroness Wavebury to solve his money problems, to the point of offering to accept Lynn into the family if he does, or the Marble Mansion will be taken.

Isabel is Richard's younger sister and the Countess Montgomery. A contrast with her brother, she is kind and understanding. She is charmed by Lynn's adorableness when they first meet. She subtly tries to make Richard more accepting of Lynn.

Robert is the household butler at Marble Mansion.

Brenda is the head maid working at Marble Mansion.

Jill is the young maid working at Marble Mansion.

Tom is the gardener working at Marble Mansion.

Prince is Mary's pet Persian cat. Playful and mischievous, he is often used by Mary as a tool in her schemes against Lynn. Though often treated kindly by Lynn, Prince is persistently causing trouble for her. He often picks on Lynn's pet cat Queen. Later of the series, however, he was disowned by his owner and was adopted by Lynn.

List of episodes

Music

Opening Theme
"LADY"
Lyrics by Masumi Kawamura
Composition and arrangement by Katsuhisa Hattori
Performed by Shonentai
Courtesy of Warner Pioneer

Ending Theme

Lyrics by Masumi Kawamura
Composition and arrangement by Katsuhisa Hattori
Performed by Shonentai
Courtesy of Warner Pioneer

Insert Theme

Lyrics by Takashi Matsumoto
Composition by Kazuo Zaitsu
Arrangement by Akira Nishihira
Performed by Nami Shimada
Courtesy of Columbia Records

Staff

Director: Hiroshi Shidara
Producer: Kazuo Yokoyama, Hiromi Seki, Hiroshi Inoue
Episode Director: Toshihiko Arisako, Yasuo Yamayoshi
Character Design: Kazuhiro Ochi
Art Design: Takao Sawada
Storyline: Tomoko Konparu
Planning: Hiromi Seki, Kazuo Yokoyama
Production Manager: Yoshiro Sugawara
Music: Kōhei Tanaka
Production Company: Toei Animation Co., Ltd., TBS

External links

Manga
Author's Official Website: リンのマーブル館 
*Milly un giorno dopo l'altro* Lady!! di Youko Hanabusa *Shoujo Manga Outline* 

Anime
Toei Animation's Official Website: Lady Lady!! 

1987 anime television series debuts
1987 manga
1988 Japanese television series endings
Akita Shoten manga
Anime series based on manga
Historical anime and manga
Shōjo manga
Toei Animation films
Toei Animation television
TBS Television (Japan) original programming
Television shows set in England
Television shows set in London
Comics set in London
Comics set in England